

List of rulers of the Manya Krobo State

See also
Dangme
Ghana
Gold Coast
Lists of office-holders

Rulers
Government of Ghana
Manya Krobo Traditional Area